Ochradenus is a genus of plant in family Resedaceae. It contains the following species (but this list may be incomplete):
 Ochradenus socotranus, 
 Ochradenus baccatus

A recent molecular study found that Ochradenus arose from within the ranks of Reseda. Therefore, in future this genus may be abandoned, and its species transferred into Reseda.

References

Brassicales genera
Resedaceae
Taxonomy articles created by Polbot